Over the Goal is a 1937 American comedy film directed by Noel M. Smith and written by William Jacobs and Anthony Coldeway. The film stars June Travis, William Hopper, Johnnie Davis, Gordon Oliver, William Harrigan and Willard Parker. The film was released by Warner Bros. on October 16, 1937.

Plot

A wealthy alumnus of Carlton College promises to leave his fortune to the school, but only if it can defeat football rival State three consecutive years. After two victories in a row, the alumnus dies. His descendants want his money for themselves, and therefore desperately want Carlton to lose the big game.

Ken Thomas is the star player for Carlton, but he is injured and a doctor has cautioned him that he risks permanent damage to his health if he plays. Ken has given his word to girlfriend Lucille that he won't play, but after she releases him from that promise, the rich benefactor's relatives scheme to have Ken accused of stealing a car and placed under arrest.

Campus friends come to his rescue just in time for Ken to suit up for Carlton and save the day.

Cast         
June Travis as Lucille Martin
William Hopper as Ken Thomas
Johnnie Davis as Tiny Waldron
Gordon Oliver as Benton
William Harrigan as Jim Shelly
Willard Parker as Duke Davis
Eric Stanley as Dr. Martin
Raymond Hatton as Deputy Abner
Herbert Rawlinson as Stanley Short
Douglas Wood as Dr. Marshall 
Eddie "Rochester" Anderson as William 
Hattie McDaniel as Hannah 
Fred MacKaye as Clay
Eddy Chandler as Police Sergeant Peters 
George Offerman Jr. as Teddy
Jack Chapin as Bill 'Pinky'
Robert Hoover as Larkin
John Craven as King

Reception
Frank Nugent of The New York Times said, "Over the Goal is just another of those football films, leading circuitously to the inevitable moment when Carlton's white hope breaks away from his jailers to change the score from 0—13 to 14—13 in the last two minutes of play. The only difference between it and its cinematic uncles, aunts, cousins and grandfathers is the cast. It has several new faces, the best among them being the comic one of Johnnie Davis, formerly of Fred Waring's orchestra. We still feel two indifferent pictures do not compensate for the absence of one good one."

References

External links 
 

1937 films
1937 comedy films
American black-and-white films
American comedy films
American football films
American sports comedy films
Films directed by Noel M. Smith
Films scored by Heinz Roemheld
Films set in universities and colleges
Warner Bros. films
1930s English-language films
1930s American films